The 1710s decade ran from January 1, 1710 to December 31, 1719.

References